District XVII was, according to Herodotus, the 17th satrapy of the Achaemenid Empire. It comprised the Paricanians and Asiatic Ethiopians.

See also
 Baluchistan

References

Achaemenid satrapies
History of Ethiopia
History of Balochistan